The Ybbstal Alps are a mountain range of the Northern Limestone Alps and part of the Eastern Alps, located in Austria.

They occupy an area along the borders of the states of Upper Austria, Lower Austria and Styria. The range includes the eastern part of the Eisenwurzen, as well as the Göstling Alps and the Kräuterin in the south.

The Göstling Alps are home to the popular skiing area at Hochkar (1,808 metres).

Another popular mountain is the Dürrenstein at 1,878 m.

References

Northern Limestone Alps
Mountain ranges of the Alps
Mountain ranges of Lower Austria
Mountain ranges of Upper Austria
Mountain ranges of Styria